Reda Aleliūnaitė-Jankovska (born 24 January 1973) is a former Soviet and Lithuanian female professional basketball player.

External links
Profile at fibaeurope.com

1973 births
Living people
Centers (basketball)
Galatasaray S.K. (women's basketball) players
Lithuanian women's basketball players
Basketball players from Kaunas
Soviet women's basketball players